John Richard Barnes (July 28, 1833 – January 21, 1919) served in the first Utah State Senate.

Barnes was a native of Sandy, Bedfordshire, England.  He joined the Church of Jesus Christ of Latter-day Saints in 1848.  In 1853 he emigrated from England to Utah.  He was for many years ward clerk of the Kaysville ward under bishop Christopher Layton.  He was a member of Utah's 1895 Constitutional Convention and elected as a Republican to the State Senate that same year.  He was also a director of Zion's Cooperative Mercantile Institution.

References

Andrew Jenson. Latter-day Saint Biographical Encyclopedia. vol. 1, p. 464.

1833 births
1919 deaths
Converts to Mormonism
English Latter Day Saints
English emigrants to the United States
People from Kaysville, Utah
Republican Party Utah state senators
People from Sandy, Bedfordshire